Andria D'Souza (AKA Ria D'Souza) is an Indian born in Dubai. She is a TV presenter for Zee Connect, a TV Anchor on Zee TV and an actor based in India, and is mainly active in Hindi and Malayalam films, such as Six X.

Filmography

 Nirel - as herself
 Casanovva - as Mariam Thomas
 Kamasutra 3D  - as Arabian queen
 Six-x - as Kamini

Television
 Zee TV, Vj Andria for Zee Connect, Season 1-3
Maati, Pakistani serial as Maya, on IndusTV   
 Kismat Ki  Baat Sundeep Kochar ka Saath, Zee Hindustan.

References

External links
 
 

Emirati actresses
Emirati film actresses
Living people
Year of birth missing (living people)
People from Dubai
Indian expatriates in the United Arab Emirates
Actresses in Hindi cinema
Actresses in Malayalam cinema